Babos  is a Hungarian surname. Notable people with the surname include:

 Adam Babos (born 1992), Hungarian artistic gymnast
 Ágnes Babos (born 1944), former Hungarian handball player
 Gábor Babos (born 1974), former Hungarian footballer
 Margit Babos (1931–2009), Hungarian mycologist
 Tímea Babos (born 1993), Hungarian tennis player

See also
 Babo (disambiguation)

Hungarian-language surnames